Tugili is a village in the Thanjavur District of Tamil Nadu, India. It is next to the village of Kanjanoor.

There is a temple for Lord Shiva in this village. It is believed that worshipping in this temple would ensure that the worshipper does not face any issues in getting proper clothing. 

Villages in Thanjavur district